Weddell may refer to:

People
 Alan Weddell (born 1950), American college football coach
 Alexander W. Weddell (1876–1948), American diplomat; ambassador to Argentina and Spain
 Hugh Algernon Weddell (1819–1877), English botanist
 James Weddell (1787–1834), English navigator and Antarctic explorer
 Robert Weddell (1882–1951), Australian soldier and government administrator

Places
 Weddell, Northern Territory, a locality in Australia
 Weddell Glacier on South Georgia Island in the South Atlantic Ocean
 Weddell Gyre, an ocean current in the Weddell Sea
 Weddell Island, one of the Falkland Islands in the South Atlantic Ocean
 Weddell Islands, in the South Orkney Islands
 Weddell Plain, an undersea abyssal plain 
 Weddell Point, on South Georgia Island
 Weddell Point, Weddell Island in the Falkland Islands
 Weddell Polynya, an area of water surrounded by sea ice in the Weddell Sea
 Weddell Sea, near Antarctica south of the Atlantic Ocean
 Weddell Settlement, on Weddell Island in the Falkland Islands

See also
 Weddell seal, Antarctic seal, most southerly distribution of any mammal
 Weddle, another surname
 Wedel (disambiguation)